Sir Barry Blyth Holloway, KBE (26 September 193416 January 2013) was an Australian-born Papua New Guinean politician.

Early life 

Sir Barry, a sixth generation Tasmanian, was born in Kimberley, Tasmania on 26 Sep 1934, to Betty (née Blyth) and Arch Holloway, in the homestead "Armitstead", the same house where his mother was born. He was educated in Kimberley, Launceston Church Grammar School and Hobart High School.

Kiap 

In 1953 aged 18 he went to Papua New Guinea as a 'Kiap' (Patrol Officer), fell in love with the place, has made PNG his home ever since, and even relinquished his Australian citizenship to become a PNG citizen in 1975 when PNG gained independence from Australia (PNG do not allow dual citizenship). He spent most of his life in Port Moresby and in the Eastern Highlands (Kainantu and Goroka).

His first posting, or one of his early postings was over in Bougainville, where he experienced some of the sort of the challenges and the rigours of being a Kiap, being combination of policeman, judge, jury, social worker and development official.

In a recent interview with ABC, the late Sir Barry said: "We started a six-week orientation course. We were given basic multi-functional activities to do, such as learning how to map, how to handle government stores and all sorts of clerical work which really dampened our spirits somewhat, because we were coming up for high adventure," he said. After two years with a senior patrol officer on the island of Bougainville, he was sent off on his own to man a remote outpost in Madang Province.

In 1960, Sir Barry worked as a Patrol Officer with Graham Pople as well as the District Officer at Kainantu. There was one Land Rover allocated to all officers and often the District Officer would use the vehicle. Mr. Pople states;

"Barry overcame this problem in his own way. He went out and bought a Volkswagen (Beetle) and this was used by us a heck of a lot. Our work was a lot more efficient because of the availability of Barry's vehicle. "Management" was all aware how vital to our successful work that this vehicle was".

Politician 

In 1968, Papua New Guinea having begun a transition towards self-government, he was (along with Albert Maori Kiki, Michael Somare and Tony Voutas) a founding member the Pangu Pati, "the first real political party in Papua New Guinea", which went on to become one of the country's main political parties. In the 1968 general election, he was elected to the House of Assembly as MP for Kainantu.

Following the 1972 general election, he was elected as the first Speaker of the House. Papua New Guinea became fully independent from Australia in 1975, at which time he assumed Papua New Guinea citizenship and surrendered his Australian passport. He became the first Speaker of the National Parliament, until the 1977 general election, in which he retained his seat in Parliament but was appointed Minister of Finance by Prime Minister Michael Somare. He retained the position in Cabinet under Prime Minister Julius Chan from 1980 to 1982. In 1985, he was one of several MPs to leave the Pangu Pati.

He was still active in politics shortly before his death, standing unsuccessfully for the position of Governor of the Eastern Highlands Province in the 2012 general election, losing to Julie Soso. He died of prostate cancer in hospital in Brisbane on 16 January 2013. In accordance with his wishes, he was buried next to his parents at his birthplace, Kimberley, Tasmania; the burial took place on Australia Day, 26 January 2013.

Komuniti Kaunsil Bisnis 

Sir Barry assisted establish the Farmers' and Settlers' Co-operative and promoted communal ownership of business with government involvement resulting in people from Kainantu and Obura-Wonenara contributing to 'Komuniti Kaunsil Bisnis' and acquired various plantations. Under Sir Barry, the cooperative acquired more than 40% of a competing company that was opposed to the cooperative ideology (Farmset). The cooperative became a dominant force in Kainantu.

Komuniti Kaunsil Bisnis, Kainantu owns Farmset Limited and has 200 employees, 10 branches, headquarters in Goroka and a distribution network that spreads beyond PNG to other markets in the south-west Pacific.

Kainantu Hotel 

Sir Barry's portrait hangs in the conference room of the Kainantu Hotel.  It is believed that Sir Barry built and managed this hotel.  Following his death, the hotel is owned and operated by Komuniti Kaunsil Bisnis

Personal

Sir Barry had 12 children that he acknowledged, but is believed to have had four others. His first wife, with whom he had three children, was Australian; his other wives were Papua New Guinean.

Awards
Holloway was made a Commander of the Order of the British Empire (CBE) in the 1975 Birthday Honours. He was made a Knight Commander of the Order of the British Empire (KBE) in the 1984 New Year Honours.

References

1934 births
2013 deaths
Members of the House of Assembly of Papua and New Guinea
Speakers of the National Parliament of Papua New Guinea
Members of the National Parliament of Papua New Guinea
Knights Commander of the Order of the British Empire
Ministers of Finance of Papua New Guinea
Pangu Party politicians
People from Tasmania
Australian emigrants to Papua New Guinea